Cisthene dorsimacula is a moth of the family Erebidae. It was described by Harrison Gray Dyar Jr. in 1904. It is found in southern California, United States.

The length of the forewings is about 9 mm. Adults have been recorded on wing from May to August and in October.

References

Cisthenina
Moths described in 1904